Cryptocaryon irritans is a species of ciliates that parasitizes marine fish, causing marine white spot disease or marine ich (pronounced ick). It is one of the most common causes of disease in marine aquaria.

Taxonomy
Cryptocaryon irritans was originally classified as Ichthyophthirius marinus, but it is not closely related to the other species.  It belongs to the class Prostomatea, but beyond that its placement is still uncertain.

Clinical
The symptoms and life-cycle are generally similar to those of Ichthyophthirius in freshwater fish, including white spots, on account of which Cryptocaryon is usually called marine ich.  However, Cryptocaryon can spend a much longer time encysted.  Fish that are infected with Cryptocaryon may have small white spots, nodules, or patches on their skin, fins, or gills. They may also have ragged fins, cloudy eyes, pale gills, increased mucus production, or changes in skin color, and they may appear thin. Behaviorally, fish may act different.  They may scratch, swim abnormally, act lethargic, hang at the surface or on the bottom, or breathe more rapidly as if they are in distress.

Useful treatments (but not safe for reef tanks or invertebrates) of Cryptocaryon irritans are copper solutions, formalin solutions and quinine based drugs (such as chloroquine phosphate and quinine diphosphate).

Infections can be extremely difficult to treat because of the presence of other creatures in the tank, such as corals and other invertebrates, which will not survive standard treatments.  Ideally fish with Cryptocaryon are quarantined in a hospital tank, where they can be treated with a copper salt or using hyposalinity, 1.009 specific gravity. The display tank needs to be kept clear of fish for 6–9 weeks, the longer the better. This gives time for the encysted tomonts to release infectious theronts, which die within 24–48 hours when they cannot find a host.

See also
 Freshwater ich for the similar disease of freshwater fishes

References

Further reading

External links
Cryptocaryon

Intramacronucleata
Ciliate genera
Fish diseases
Veterinary protozoology